Viola Roehl was an American film editor who cut B movies in the early 1930s.

Biography 
Viola was born to Max Roehl and Myrtle Bonner in Butte, Montana. The family moved west in the early 1920s. According to census records, she was already working as a film cutter by 1930, however she didn't receive her first credit until 1931's Sheer Luck. She married James Jefferys in 1933, and the pair had a son. Her date of death is unknown.

Selected filmography 

 Neck and Neck (1931)
 Chinatown After Dark (1931)
 The Sky Spider (1931)
 Sheer Luck (1931)

References 

1905 births
American women film editors
Year of death missing
American film editors